Maximiliano Arboleya (1870–1951) was a Spanish sociologist, priest, and activist.

See also
Catholic Church in Spain

References

1870 births
1951 deaths
Spanish sociologists
Spanish Roman Catholic priests